The Lux Style Awards is an award ceremony held annually in Pakistan since 2002. The awards celebrate "style" in the Pakistani entertainment industry, and it is the oldest event dedicated to cinema, television, fashion, music and film industry in Pakistan. Categories have changed over the years, but most are awarded by panels of judges who are experts in the respective industries, with some "people's choice" awards in the film and TV categories.

The ceremonies, which are televised, have usually been held in Karachi, but in some years have taken place in Lahore, Kuala Lumpur and Dubai.

History 
The Lux Style Awards were created and developed in 2002 by Naheed Chowdhry, the female executive who headed the Unilever Lux team at the time, in collaboration with Frieha Altaf, TV and event producer and former model. It is the largest annual awards ceremony held in Pakistan as well as the oldest.

"I wanted to ensure that there was a sustainable legacy created  that impartially assessed contributors and gave back to society through scholarships in the arts and culture arena", says Chowdhry."One that would go on to be recognized as the 'Oscars' of Pakistan."

The first awards were presented in 2002 at the Naval Base in Karachi, Pakistan due to heightened security and high-profile attendance. The Awards Ceremony was preceded by seven days of exhibitions and fashion shows at different smaller venues throughout Karachi and on Manora Island, as a build-up to the final show. Since 2002, the event has been condensed to three days, hosting various events and activities relating to the Pakistan film industry.

The ceremony was postponed in 2008 owing to security concerns and economic conditions, and in the same year, it was decided to provide annual scholarships to students of the National College of Arts (TV and Film), National Academy of Performing Arts (Music), and to two fashion schools.

Viewer's Choice Awards for best male and female actors had originally been added to engage audiences viewing the show. In 2019, it was decided to add critics' choice awards for these categories as well.
The Lux Awards have been televised in most years.

Ceremonies 
The following is a listing of all Lux Style Awards ceremonies since 2002.

Categories

Films
 Lux Style Award for Best Film (Audience Voted) 
 Lux Style Award for Best Film Director (Jury Voted) 
 Lux Style Award for Best Film Actor-Viewers' Choice
 Lux Style Award for Best Film Actress-Viewers' Choice
 Lux Style Award for Best Film Actor-Critics' Choice
 Lux Style Award for Best Film Actress-Critics' Choice
 Lux Style Award for Best Film Playback Song (Audience Voted)

Television
 Lux Style Award for Best TV Play (Audience Voted) 
 Lux Style Award for Best TV Ensemble (Jury Voted) 
 Lux Style Award for Best TV Director (Jury Voted) 
 Lux Style Award for Best TV Actor-Viewers' Choice
 Lux Style Award for Best TV Actress-Viewers' Choice
 Lux Style Award for Best TV Writer (Jury Voted) 
 Lux Style Award for Best TV Actor-Critics' Choice
 Lux Style Award for Best TV Actress-Critics' Choice
 Lux Style Award for Best Emerging Talent in TV (Jury Voted) 
 Lux Style Award for Best TV Track (Audience Voted)
 Lux Style Award for Best TV Long Play (Audience Voted)

Music
 Lux Style Award for Best Song of the Year (Audience Voted)
 Lux Style Award for Best Singer of the Year (Audience Voted)
 Lux Style Award for Best Music Youth Icon (Jury Voted)  
 Lux Style Award for Best Music Producer (Jury Voted)
 Lux Style Award for Best Live Performance (Audience Voted)

Fashion (Jury Voted)
 Lux Style Award for Best Fashion Model of the Year
 Lux Style Award for Best Fashion Forward Brand  
 Lux Style Award for Best Fashion Photographer/Videographer 
 Lux Style Award for Best Fashion Stylist
 Lux Style Award for Best Fashion Makeup & Hair Artist
 Lux Style Award for Best Fashion Style Icon

Honorary
 Chairperson's Lifetime Achievement Award
 Lifetime Achievement Award in Fashion

Defunct
 Best Supporting Actor in a Film
 Best Supporting Actress in a Film
 Best Male Playback in a Film
 Best Female Playback in a Film 
 Best TV Play-Satellite
 Best TV Director-Satellite
 Best TV Actor-Satellite
 Best TV Actress-Satellite
 Best TV Play-Terrestrial
 Best TV Director-Terrestrial
 Best TV Actor-Terrestrial 
 Best TV Actress-Terrestrial
 Best Artist of the Year 
 Best Album of the Year 
 Best Band of the Year 
 Best Music Director 
 Best Video Director (Jury Voted)
 Best Achievement in Fashion Design (Menswear)
 Best Achievement in Fashion Design (Womenswear) 
 Best Achievement in Fashion Design (Prét)
 Best Achievement in Fashion Design (Luxury Prét)
 Best Achievement in Fashion Design (Lawn) 
 Best Achievement in Fashion Design (Bridal)
 Best Achievement in Fashion Design (0-5 Years) 
 Best Achievement in Fashion Design (5-15 Years) 
 Best Emerging Talent in Fashion 
 Most Stylish Sportsperson
 Best Fashion Publication 
 Best Model of the Year (male)
 Best Model of the Year (female)

Controversies

Aminah Haq's Best TV Actress Win for Mehndi 
Aminah Haq won Best TV Actress at 3rd Lux Style Awards for her performance in Mehndi. Many thought that Sania Saeed gave a better performance in Thori Si Mohabat that year, and the only reason she lost was that her play was broadcast by a private TV channel (Geo Entertainment). On the other hand, Mehndi was aired on PTV that was widely available all over the country and was more accessible for audiences. So, for 4th Lux Style Awards it was decided that there would be separate acting and play categories for terrestrial and satellite TV channels.

Snub of Zindagi Gulzar Hai in Best TV Play (Satellite) Category 
Zindagi Gulzar Hai was nominated in all TV categories at 13th Lux Style Awards except for the Best TV Play-Satellite, eventually winning for Best TV Actor-Satellite (Fawad Khan) and Best TV Actress-Satellite (Sanam Saeed). Many were disappointed with the omission of the most popular drama of the year in the biggest TV category. In response, next year Hum TV did not submit it's TV plays to 14th Lux Style Awards.

Mahira Khan's Best Film Actress Win for Verna 
Mahira Khan was awarded Best Film Actress for Verna at 17th Lux Style Awards. Verna was considered a box office flop and it received mediocre reviews from critics. Many accused LSAs of being rigged as Mahira was the "Lux Girl" at that time.

Punjab Nahi Jaungi was released the same year and became highest grossing Pakistani film of all the time. It also received glowing reviews from critics. Many were disappointed when the presumed front-runner Mehwish Hayat lost the award for her phenomenal performance in Punjab Nahi Jaungi to Mahira.

In response, a statement was released by LSA stating that the Best Film Actress was a audience voted category and Mahira got the most votes that year as she had the biggest social media presence.  Next year, LSA introduced critics choice' acting categories for the 18th edition.

Ali Zafar's Nominations at 18th Lux Style Awards 
Many celebrities pulled out their nominations from 18th Lux Style Awards in the wake of MeToo movement. Ali Zafar was nominated for Best Film and Best Film Actor that year, many celebrities took to social media to give their support towards Meesha Shafi who previously made sexual harassment allegations against Ali. They urged LSA jury to pull out his nominations. When the jury denied their request many decided not to be a part of the ceremony, celebrities that pulled out their nominations from entertainment categories included:
 The Sketches, who were nominated for Best Playback (for "Meri Duniya" from Cake), Best TV Track (for Naulakha), Best Song (for "Raat"), and Best Singer (for "Raat")
 Faris Shafi (Meesha's brother) nominated for Best Song (for Clap) 
 Meesha herself pulled out her Best Singer nomination for Mein

Multiple Solo Acting Wins in a Single Year

Lux Style Award for Best Film

Introduction 

Until 2011, this was chosen by public voting. From 2012 onwards, the winner has been chosen by an LSA jury. Tere Pyaar Mein was the first winner. Every year, LSA jury short lists number of films between 1 and 10. Only those short listed films are nominated in the ceremony. Usually, five films are nominated for Best Film. In 2004, 2005, 2006, 2007, 2009 and 2011, no nominations were announced due to lack of films releases. In 2010 and 2012, no award was given because jury did not find any film worth winning. Three films were nominated in 2001, 2002 and 2008. In 2013, four films were nominated for the award.

Best Film and Best Director 
Best Film and Best Director are closely linked. Only one film (Cake) has been able to win Best Film without winning Best Director.

Winners and nominees

Multiple Wins
 Fizza Ali Meerza-3
 Shoaib Mansoor-2

Lux Style Award for Best Film Director

Multiple Wins 
 Nabeel Qureshi-2
 Syed Noor-2

Lux Style Award for Best Film Actor (Viewers' Choice)

Multiple Wins (Viewers' Choice + Critics' Choice + Supporting) 
 Shaan Shahid-6
 Javed Sheikh-3
 Humayun Saeed-2
 Moammar Rana-2
 Fahad Mustafa-2

Lux Style Award for Best Film Actor (Critics' Choice)

Lux Style Award for Best Film Actress (Viewers' Choice)

Multiple Wins (Viewers' Choice + Critics' Choice + Supporting) 
 Mahira Khan-5
 Saima Noor-2
 Zara Sheikh-2

Lux Style Award for Best Film Actress (Critics' Choice)

Lux Style Award for Best Film Playback

Multiple Wins 
 Rahat Fateh Ali Khan-2
 Aima Baig-2
 Atif Aslam-2

Records by films 

Most Awards 
 Majajan-4
 Khuda Kay Liye-4
 Na Maloom Afraad-4
 Punjab Nahi Jaungi-4
 Actor in Law-4
 Laal Kabootar-4
 Khel Khel Mein-4
Most Nominations
 Na Maloom Afraad-9
 Jawani Phir Nahi Ani-9
 Ho Mann Jahaan-9
 Moor-9
Most Nominations without Winning 
 Manto-7
Big Four (Best Film, Best Director, Best Actor and Best Actress) Winners 
 Majajan-4

Lux Style Award for Best TV Play

Lux Style Award for Best TV Long Play

Criticism
Due to category being audience voted many of the groundbreaking dramas like Udaari, Sang-e-Mar Mar and Dar Si Jaati Hai Sila failed to win Best TV Play despite winning in other major categories like Best TV Director and Best TV Writer. As of 2021 nominations were voted by public, some of the most critically acclaimed plays like Raqeeb Se and Dil Na Umeed To Nahi were not even nominated for the award despite dominating other major categories.

Multiple Wins 
 PTV-12
 Hum TV-7
 ARY-5
 Geo Entertainment-4

Lux Style Award for Best TV Director

Multiple Wins 
 Kashif Nisar-3
 Anjum Shahzad-3
 Sarmad Khoosat-2
 Babar Javed-2

Lux Style Award for Best TV Actor (Viewers' Choice)

Multiple Wins (Viewers' Choice + Critics' Choice + Satellite + Terrestrial) 
 Noman Ijaz-10
 Humayun Saeed-5
 Faisal Qureshi-4
 Talat Hussain-2
 Fawad Khan-2
 Feroze Khan-2

Lux Style Award for Best TV Actor (Critics' Choice)

Lux Style Award for Best TV Actress (Viewers' Choice)

Multiple Wins (Viewers' Choice + Critics' Choice + Satellite + Terrestrial) 

 Sania Saeed-4
 Bushra Ansari-3
 Yumna Zaidi-3
 Iqra Aziz-3
 Mahira Khan-2
 Sadia Imam-2
 Aiza Khan-2

Lux Style Award for Best TV Actress (Critics' Choice)

Lux Style Award for Best TV Writer

Multiple Wins 
 Khalil-ur-Rehman Qamar-3
 Umera Ahmad-2

Lux Style Award for Best TV Ensemble
{| class="wikitable style"
! Year
! Winners
! Winning Cast
! Nominations 
|-
! 2021
|Dil Na Umeed To Nahi (TV One)
| Yumna Zaidi, Wahaj Ali, Samiya Mumtaz, Yasra Rizvi & ''''
|
 Chupke Chupke (Hum TV) Parizaad (Hum TV) Raqeeb Se (Hum TV)|}

 Lux Style Award for Best Emerging Talent in TV

 Lux Style Award for Best TV Track 

 Multiple Wins 
 Qurat-ul-Ain Balouch-2
 Rahat Fateh Ali Khan-2

 Records in Television 

 Most Award Won by a TV Play 
 Humsafar-6
 Pyarey Afzal-5
 Ranjha Ranjha Kardi-5

 Lux Style Award for Best Song of the Year 

 Multiple Wins 
 Quratulain Balouch-2
 Sajjad Ali-2

 Lux Style Award for Best Singer of the Year 

 Lux Style Award for Best Music Youth Icon

 Lux Style Award for Best Music Producer

 Lux Style Award for Best Live Performance

 Lux Style Award for Best Video Director 

 Multiple Wins 
 Ahsan Rahim-2
 Bilal Lashari-2

 Directors that went on to be nominated for Best Film Director 
 2007-Shoaib Mansoor for Khuda Kay Liye-Won (Best Film)
 2011-Shoaib Mansoor for Bol-Won (Best Film) 
 2013-Bilal Lashari for Waar-Nominated
 2014-Jami for O21-Nominated
 2015-Jami for Moor-Won
 2016-Asim Raza for Ho Mann Jahaan-Nominated
 2017-Shoaib Mansoor for Verna-Nominated
 2018-Ahsan Rahim for Teefa in Trouble-Won
 2019-Kamal Khan for Laal Kabootar-Won
 2019-Saqib Malik for Baaji-Nominated
 2019-Asim Raza for Parey Hut Love-Nominated

Lux Style Award for Best Fashion Model of the Year

Multiple Wins
Hasnain Lehri-4
Shahzad Noor-3
Ameer Zeb Khan-3
Abbas Jafri-2
Iftikhar Zafar-2
Vaneeza Ahmed-2
Sadaf Kanwal-2
Rabia Butt-2
Neha Ahmed-2

Lux Style Award for Best Fashion Forward Brand

Multiple Wins
Khaadi-7
Generation-2

Lux Style Award for Best Fashion Makeup & Hair Artist

Multiple Wins
Nabila-10
Saima Rashid Bargfrede-2
Qasim Liaqat-2
Sunil Nawab-2Note: Nabila is always credited with her Creative Team''

Lux Style Award for Best  Fashion Photographer/Videographer

Multiple Wins
Rizwan-ul-Haq-6
Ather Shahzad-3
Shahbaz Shazi-2
Guddu Shani-2
Khawar Riaz-2

Lux Style Award for Best  Fashion Style Icon

Lux Style Award for Best  Fashion Stylist

Chairperson's Lifetime Achievement Award

See also
 List of Nigar Awards
 List of Asian television awards
 List of fashion awards

References

External links

 
Annual events in Pakistan
Awards established in 2002
Pakistani film awards
Pakistani television awards
Pakistani music awards
Pakistani fashion awards
2002 establishments in Pakistan